Alan Farrell (born 29 December 1977) is an Irish Fine Gael politician who has been a Teachta Dála (TD) for the Dublin Fingal constituency since 2016, and previously from 2011 to 2016 for the Dublin North constituency. He previously served as Chair of the Committee on Children and Youth Affairs from 2016 to 2020.

Political career
Farrell served as a Fingal County Councillor from 2004 to 2011 and as Mayor of Fingal from 2007 to 2008.

31st Dáil
In the 31st Dáil, Farrell was a member of the Joint Oireachtas Committee on Justice, Equality and Defence and the Joint Oireachtas Committee on Finance, Public Expenditure and Reform. He was also the chairperson of the Fine Gael Committee on Public Expenditure and Reform from 2011 to 2013 and the Fine Gael Committee on Justice, Defense and Equality from 2013 to 2016.

Farrell was the subject of controversy after he hired his wife, Emma Doyle, as his temporary parliamentary assistant for four months in the Dáil. This was just two weeks after she was rejected by Farrell's Malahide Fine Gael Party branch as his replacement on Fingal County Council in 2011. Parliamentary assistants salaries range between €41,092 and €52,200 per year, which is paid for by the State.

In 2013, Farrell was appointed Head of the Irish Delegation to the OSCE Parliamentary Assembly by Taoiseach Enda Kenny.

In October 2013, he referred to singer Sinéad O'Connor as being "mad as a brush", in a tweet. He later issued a brief apology via his website and later deleted the apology.

32nd Dáil
Farrell was re-elected at the 2016 general election. In the 32nd Dáil, Farrell was a member of the Public Account Committee and the Joint Oireachtas Committee on Justice and Equality. Farrell was reappointed as Head of Delegation to the OSCE PA following the formation of Government. He was appointed Chair of the Committee on Children and Youth Affairs in July 2017.

33rd Dáil
Farrell was re-elected in the 2020 general election. On 30 September 2020, he was appointed Fine Gael’s spokesperson on Climate Action by party leader Leo Varadkar.

Controversy
Farrell took Hertz Rent A Car to court after one of its vehicles knocked against his Audi A6 while its driver was engaged in an encounter with a spider which crawled along her arm at a traffic stop. Farrell claimed to have experienced neck and shoulder injuries as a result of the collision, which occurred in Drumcondra on 9 April 2015. In 2018, a photograph - showing Farrell at the time he was supposed to have been injured holding a poster of himself on an electricity pole while standing on a ladder in Skerries - was shown in Dublin District Court. Judge Michael Coghlan looked unfavourably on the personal injuries claim, ruling that Farrell had not sustained a "significant injury" and awarding him a total of €2,500. Judge Coghlan also noted in court that a separate claim by Farrell for material damage to his car had been relinquished since the accident. Photographs taken by the driver at the scene (none were produced by Farrell) were shown to the court and some difficulty was had in locating the precise damage to Farrell's motor car. The Sunday Independent suggested the case "raises serious questions about Mr Farrell's judgment", contrasting it with insurance problems for motorists and referring to past remarks made by Farrell on Ireland's supposed "compo culture".

Personal life 
In November 2018, Farrell spoke publicly about his lifelong battle against insomnia, which often keeps him awake until 4 am. Farrell's insomnia first occurred, he has said, when he was "five or six".

References

External links

Alan Farrell's page on the Fine Gael website

 

1977 births
Living people
Fine Gael TDs
Local councillors in Fingal
Mayors of places in the Republic of Ireland
Members of the 31st Dáil
Members of the 32nd Dáil
Members of the 33rd Dáil
People from Malahide